The 1974 Cincinnati Bengals season was the franchise's 5th season in the National Football League, and the 7th overall.
Cincinnati traded Bill Bergey to Philadelphia for two first-round draft choices and a third-round pick in 1977. Jim LeClair replaced Bergey at middle linebacker. Ken Anderson won the NFL passing championship and completed a club-record 64.9 percent of his attempts. Cornerback Lemar Parrish led the NFL in punt returns.

Offseason

NFL draft

Personnel

Staff

Regular season

Schedule

Note: Intra-division opponents are in bold text.

Standings

Team stats

Team leaders
Passing: Ken Anderson (328 Att, 213 Comp, 2667 Yds, 64.9 Pct, 18 TD, 10 Int, 95.7 Rating)
Rushing: Charlie Davis (72 Att, 375 Yds, 5.2 Avg, 29 Long, 0 TD)
Receiving: Isaac Curtis (30 Rec, 633 Yds, 21.1 Avg, 77 Long, 10 TD)
Scoring: Horst Muhlmann, 65 points (11 FG; 32 PAT)

Roster

Awards and records

Pro Bowl Selection

References

External links
 Bengals on Pro Football Reference
 Bengals Schedule on jt-sw.com
 Bengals History on Official Site

Cincinnati Bengals
Cincinnati Bengals seasons
Cincinnati